Varney & Co., sometimes styled Varney & Company, is an American cable television news and talk show on the Fox Business Network hosted by British-American economic and political commentator Stuart Varney. The show includes market coverage, current events coverage, and interviews and commentary with Wall Street experts.

Hosts

Stuart Varney, host (2010—present) 
Lauren Simonetti, news anchor (2015—present)
Susan Li, correspondent, co-anchor (2019—present)
Ashley Webster, guest host, contributor & correspondent (2010—present)

Audience
In February 2015, Varney & Co. reached its highest-rated month since moving to the 11AM time slot, averaging 103,000 total viewers, 18,000 of whom were adults ages 25–54. Overall since the time change, the show was up 91% in total viewers and 31% among adults 25–54. On 24 August 2015, the show, which had switched to a three-hour slot from 9AM–12PM, set the record for Fox Business Network for that block with 230,000 total viewers and 54,000 in the 25–54-year-old demographic. In February 2016, Varney & Co., still in the 9AM–12PM slot, averaged 159,000 total viewers, up 65% from the same month one year prior.

Guests
Over the years, many other well-known political figures and celebrities have appeared regularly on the show. Notable guests have included:
 Nicole Petallides (35 episodes)
 Kayleigh McEnany (33)
 Sandra Smith, television journalist and reporter (6)
 Henrik Fisker, entrepreneur and car designer (3)
 Monica Crowley (2)
 Scottie Hughes (2)
 Melissa Francis, television journalist (1)
 Les Gold, pawnbroker (1)
 Mary Kissel, journalist (1)
 Darcy LaPier, actress (1)
 Gina Loudon, author and psychology expert (1)
 Marc Siegel, physician (1)
 Shmuley Boteach, Orthodox rabbi and writer (1)
 Patrick M. Byrne, President and CEO of Overstock.com (1)
 Elisabeth Hasselbeck, television host (1)
 Michio Kaku, theoretical physicist (1)
 Megyn Kelly, Fox News reporter and television host (1)
 Tony Little, exercise instructor (1)
 Andrew Napolitano, judge and Senior Judicial Analyst for Fox News (1)
 Katherine Schwarzenegger, writer (1)
 Jon Taffer, bar consultant and television personality (1)
 Abby Wambach, Olympic gold medal professional soccer player (1)
 Harvey J. Kaye, historian (1)
 Jonathan Greenstein, Judaica expert (1)
 Phil Bryant, 64th Governor of Mississippi (1)
 Austan Goolsbee, economist (1)
 Julie Roginsky, Democratic Party strategist (1)
 Robert J. O'Neill, former US Navy SEAL, who shot and killed Osama bin Laden in 2014 (1)
 Sam Sorbo, actress (1)
 Pete Rose, baseball player (1)
 Donald Trump, 45th President of the United States (1)

In popular culture
On 8 May 2014, Stephen Colbert on The Colbert Report satirized Stuart Varney, showing clips from his show and mocking him for being out of touch.

See also
 Countdown to the Closing Bell
 Lou Dobbs Tonight
 Markets Now
 Stossel (TV series)

References

External links

American television talk shows
Fox Business original programming
2012 American television series debuts
2020s American television talk shows